Hydro Phonic is the sixth release by the trip hop/rap rock band Phunk Junkeez, released on September 18, 2007, on Dmaft Records.

Track listing

External links
 http://www.artistdirect.com/nad/store/artist/album/0,,4393073,00.html
 http://www.cduniverse.com/productinfo.asp?pid=7500219&activetab=Product%20Detail#Product%20Detail

2007 albums
Phunk Junkeez albums